Basri Fırat Bayraktar (born 29 July 1988), better known by his stage name Kamufle, is a Turkish rapper, songwriter and actor.

Life 
Bayraktar was born and raised in Fatih, Istanbul in 1988. He has played basketball and football also he was a basketball coach.

Career 
He has been started doing music in 2004. His debut album Olumsuzluklar came out in 2012. After that he released his second album Hayale Daldım. At the middle of 2020, he released his last album 19T.

Discography

Albums

References 

Living people
1988 births
Turkish rappers
Turkish male singers
Turkish hip hop
Turkish lyricists
Singers from Istanbul